The Women's team sprint was held on 19 October 2017.

Results

Qualifying
The fastest 8 teams qualify for the first round.

First round
First round heats are held as follows:
Heat 1: 4th v 5th qualifier
Heat 2: 3rd v 6th qualifier
Heat 3: 2nd v 7th qualifier
Heat 4: 1st v 8th qualifier

The heat winners are ranked on time, from which the top 2 proceed to the gold medal final and the other 2 proceed to the bronze medal final.

 QG = qualified for gold medal final
 QB = qualified for bronze medal final

Finals
The final classification is determined in the medal finals.

References

Women's team sprint
European Track Championships – Women's team sprint